Katkar is a census town in Palghar district in the Indian state of Maharashtra.

Demographics
 India census, Katkar had a population of 6108. Males constitute 56% of the population and females 44%. Katkar has an average literacy rate of 70%, higher than the national average of 59.5%: male literacy is 78%, and female literacy is 60%. In Katkar, 23% of the population is under 6 years of age.

References

Cities and towns in Thane district